Weizman(n) is a surname, common among the  Jews, a variant of Weissmann Other transliteration variants of this spelling (with z/tz/ts in place of ss/ß) include Weitzmann, Weitsman, Wajcman, Vaytsman, Veitsman, etc.

Notable people with this surname include:
 Chaim Weizmann, a chemist, statesman, President of the World Zionist Organization, first President of Israel and founder of a research institute in Israel which eventually became the Weizmann Institute of Science
 Weizmann Institute of Science, an institute of higher learning and research in Rehovot, Israel
 Faisal-Weizmann Agreement, an agreement signed as part of the Paris Peace Conference, 1919
 Weizmann organism, a commercially valuable bacterium, included in the genus Clostridium
 WEIZAC (Weizmann Automatic Computer), the first computer in Israel, and possibly the first large-scale, stored-program, electronic computer outside the US and Europe
 Ezer Weizman, the seventh President of the State of Israel (1993-2000)
 Maria Weizmann, a sister of Israeli politician and notable scientist Chaim Weizmann
 Martin Weitzman, economist and Professor of Economics at Harvard University
 Vera Weizmann, wife of Chaim Weizmann, medical doctor and a Zionist activist

German-language surnames
Yiddish-language surnames
Jewish surnames